QFA may refer to:

 Qantas Airways
 Qatar Football Association
 Quantum finite automata
 Qualified Financial Adviser (Republic of Ireland)
 Queensland Football Association, an early governing body for Australian rules football and rugby union
 Qeshm Free Area
 Quality Franchise Association, one of 3 trade associations in the UK that provide support to the franchising industry.